Iron Township is an inactive township in Iron County, in the U.S. state of Missouri.

Iron Township was established in 1857, and named for the iron deposits of iron within its borders.

References

Townships in Missouri
Townships in Iron County, Missouri
1857 establishments in Missouri